The 2007 ANZAC test was a rugby league test match played between Australia and New Zealand at the Suncorp Stadium in Brisbane on 20 April 2007. It was the 8th Anzac test played between the two nations since the first was played under the Super League banner in 1997 and the third to be played in Brisbane.

Squads

Match Summary

References

2007 in Australian rugby league
2007 in New Zealand rugby league
Anzac Test
Rugby league in Brisbane
International rugby league competitions hosted by Australia